St Alban's Catholic High School is a secondary school and sixth form with academy status located in Ipswich, Suffolk, England.

References

External links
St Alban's Catholic High School

Secondary schools in Suffolk
Catholic secondary schools in the Diocese of East Anglia
Academies in Suffolk
Schools in Ipswich